George Theis Callesen (24 August 1874 – 25 August 1946) was an Australian rules footballer who played with Collingwood in the Victorian Football League (VFL).

Notes

External links 

George Callesen's profile at Collingwood Forever

1874 births
1946 deaths
Australian rules footballers from Victoria (Australia)
Collingwood Football Club (VFA) players
Collingwood Football Club players